Gmina Chełm is a rural gmina (administrative district) in Chełm County, Lublin Voivodeship, in eastern Poland.

The gmina contains part of the protected area called Chełm Landscape Park.

History
The municipality was formally established pursuant to the Resolution of the Provincial Council in Lublin of 5 December 1972 (effective as of 1 January 1973). Its shape resembled the 19th century Commune of Chełm. Later transformed into the Commune of Krzywiczki (with its seat in Pokrówka since the intervening period). 
Municipality of Chełm lies within two geographical regions, Volhynian Polesie and Lublin Upland.

Architectural monuments
 The tower in the Stołpie from the end of the 12th century
 The Roman Catholic All Saints Church in Depułtycze Nowe
 The Jesus Christ Lord Saviour Parish Church
 The Palace and park complex in Srebrzyszcze from 17th century
 An Inn in Nowosiółki-Kolonia
 The old mill in Uher

Environmental protection
The Municipality of Chełm  is the area of remarkable natural environment with interest picturesque landscape created by Chełm Hills, forest complex and wetlands. There are several nature reserves:
 The Nature reserve “Stawska Góra” with a scenic hill “Virgin Mountain”
 The Nature reserve “Bagno Serebryskie”
 The Nature reserve “Brzeźno”
 The Nature reserve “”Torfowisko Sobowice”

A natural monument:
 “Virgin Mountain” with the oaks in Horodyszcze-Kolonia (date of creation: 28.01.1983) an area of  1,54 ha
 Horse-chestnut (Aesculus hippocastanum) in Depułtycze Nowe (date of creation: 13.11.1987)
 Pedunculate oak (Quercus robur) in Depułtycze Nowe (date of creation: 13.11.1987)
 Small-leaved Lime (Tilia cordata) in Staw	(date of creation: 13.11.1987)
 Small-leaved Lime (Tilia cordata) in Staw	(date of creation: 13.11.1987)
 Three European larches (Larix decidua) in Stańków	(date of creation: 13.11.1987)
 River source with niche in Nowosiółki-Kolonia (date of creation: 31.07.1992)an area of 4 a
 Lathyrus laevigatus in Rudka (date of creation: 10.11.1998) an area of 2 ha

Villages
Gmina Chełm contains the villages and settlements of Antonin, Depułtycze Królewskie, Depułtycze Królewskie-Kolonia, Henrysin, Horodyszcze, Horodyszcze-Kolonia, Janów, Józefin, Koza-Gotówka, Krzywice, Krzywice-Kolonia, Nowe Depułtycze, Nowiny, Nowosiółki, Nowosiółki-Kolonia, Ochoża-Kolonia, Okszów, Okszów-Kolonia, Parypse, Podgórze, Pokrówka, Rożdżałów, Rożdżałów-Kolonia, Rudka, Srebrzyszcze, Stańków, Stare Depułtycze, Staw, Stołpie, Strupin Duży, Strupin Łanowy, Strupin Mały, Tytusin, Uher, Weremowice, Wojniaki, Wólka Czułczycka, Zagroda, Zarzecze, Zawadówka, Żółtańce and Żółtańce-Kolonia.

Neighbouring gminas
Gmina Chełm is bordered by the city of Chełm and by the gminas of Dorohusk, Kamień, Leśniowice, Rejowiec, Ruda-Huta, Sawin, Siedliszcze, Siennica Różana and Wierzbica.

References
Polish official population figures 2006

Chelm
Chełm County